"White People for Peace" is a protest song by punk band Against Me! released in 2007, containing two new songs: the title track, and "Full Sesh". In the United States, it was pressed on both black and red vinyl, with a reported 4,500 and 500 copies pressed respectively. There was also a UK pressing of the record that was pressed onto white vinyl, limited to 1,000.

The record is available at live shows, on iTunes, or on the band's Myspace page through SNOCAP.  "White People For Peace" also appears on Against Me!'s 2007 full-length, New Wave.

In September 2007, a 12" version of the single was available.  It features the album version on the A-side and a remix by Butch Vig on the B-side. This song was #65 on Rolling Stones list of the 100 Best Songs of 2007.

Track listing
"White People For Peace" – 3:32
"Full Sesh" – 3:06

Music video
The music video features war as a sport involving two teams of soldiers fighting on a football field. Cheerleaders celebrate the violence as the fat cat politician screams for more violence. A lone protester, whose sickly appearance reflects his weak voice in society, is in the same stadium screaming at the events taking place.

The video was directed by Adam Egypt Mortimer and performed by the No Mercy Video Stunt Team.

See also
List of anti-war songs

References

2007 singles
Against Me! songs
Song recordings produced by Butch Vig
Protest songs
Anti-war songs
Songs against capitalism
2007 songs
Sire Records singles
Songs written by Laura Jane Grace